A nanolattice is a synthetic porous material consisting of nanometer-size members patterned into an ordered lattice structure, like a space frame. The nanolattice is a newly emerged material class that has been rapidly developed over the last decade. Nanolattices redefine the limits of the material property space. Despite being composed of 50-99% of air, nanolattices are very mechanically robust because they take advantage of size-dependent properties that we generally see in nanoparticles, nanowires, and thin films. The most typical mechanical properties of nanolattices include ultrahigh strength, damage tolerance, and high stiffness. Thus, nanolattices have a wide range of applications.
 
Driven by the evolution of 3D printing techniques, nanolattices aiming to exploit beneficial material size effects through miniaturized lattice designs were first developed in the mid-2010s,. Nanolattices are the smallest man-made lattice truss structures and a class of metamaterials that derive their properties from both their geometry (general metamaterial definition) and the small size of their elements. Therefore, they can possess effective properties not found in nature, and that may not be achieved with larger-scale lattices of the same geometry.

Synthesis
To produce nanolattice materials, polymer templates are manufactured by high-resolution 3D printing processes, such as multiphoton lithography, self-assembly, self-propagating photopolymer waveguides, and direct laser writing techniques. Those methods can synthesize the structure with a unit cell size down to the order of 50 nanometers. Genetic engineering also has the potential in synthesizing nanolattice. Ceramic, metal or composite material nanolattices are formed by post-treatment of the polymer templates with techniques including pyrolysis, atomic layer deposition, electroplating and electroless plating. Pyrolysis, which additionally shrinks the lattices by up to 90%, creates the smallest-size structures, whereby the polymeric template material transforms into carbon, or other ceramics and metals, through thermal decomposition in inert atmosphere or vacuum.

Properties
At the nanoscale, size effects and different dimensional constraints, like grain boundaries, dislocations, and distribution of voids, can tremendously change the properties of a material. Nanolattices possess unparalleled mechanical properties. Nanolattices are the strongest existing cellular materials despite being extremely light-weight. Though consisting of 50%-99% air, nanolattice can be as strong as steel. Its effective strength can reach up to 1 GPa. On the order of 50nm, the extremely small volume of their individual members, such as walls, nodes, and trusses, thereby statistically nearly eliminates the material flaw population and the base material of nanolattices can reach mechanical strengths on the order of the theoretical strength of an ideal, perfect crystal. While such effects are typically limited to individual, geometrically primitive structures like nanowires, the specific architecture allows nanolattices to exploit them in complex, three-dimensional structures of notably larger overall size. Nanolattices can be designed highly deformable and recoverable, even with ceramic base materials. Nanolattices are able to undergo 80% compressive strain without catastrophic failure and then still recover to 100% original shape. Nanolattices can possess mechanical metamaterial properties like auxetic (negative Poisson's ratio) or meta-fluidic behavior (large Bulk modulus). Nanolattices can combine mechanical resilience and ultra-low thermal conductivity and can have electromagnetic metamaterial characteristics like optical cloaking. However, one of the challenges in nanolattices research is figure how to retain the robust properties while scaling up. It is inherently difficult to keep nanoscale size effects in bulk structure. The straightforward workaround to overcome this challenge is to combine bulk processes with thin film deposition techniques to retain the frame space hollow structure.

Application
The first market for nanolattices may be small-scale, small-lot components for biomedical, electrochemical, microfluidic, and aerospace applications, which require highly customizable and extreme combinations of properties. In the aerospace industry, the application of nanolattice could make the aircraft lighter and save lots of energy.

See also
 Metamaterials
 Nanomaterials
 Microlattice

References

Nanomaterials
Metamaterials
Foams